Dayton Township may refer to the following places in the United States:

 Dayton Township, LaSalle County, Illinois
 Dayton Township, Bremer County, Iowa
 Dayton Township, Butler County, Iowa
 Dayton Township, Cedar County, Iowa
 Dayton Township, Chickasaw County, Iowa
 Dayton Township, Wright County, Iowa
 Dayton Township, Saline County, Kansas
 Dayton Township, Newaygo County, Michigan
 Dayton Township, Tuscola County, Michigan
 Dayton Township, Newton County, Missouri

Township name disambiguation pages